Kate Reinders (born December 10, 1980) is an American actress and singer, who has performed as lead and understudy in several Broadway shows. Reinders was born in Seattle, Washington, but raised in Spring Lake, Michigan. She attended Western Michigan Christian High School, graduating in 1998.

Career
Reinders' Broadway debut was in The Adventures of Tom Sawyer as a swing and understudy for characters Amy Lawrence and Becky Thatcher. She next joined the 2002 Broadway revival of Into the Woods as an understudy for Cinderella, Little Red Riding Hood, Milky White, and Rapunzel. Her first starring role was in the 2003 revival of Gypsy as June; she went on to play Caroline in the 2005 jukebox musical Good Vibrations.

Reinders played Glinda in the 2005 Chicago production of Wicked, alongside Ana Gasteyer as Elphaba; for this role, she received a Joseph Jefferson Award nomination for Best Actress in a Principal Role. She and Gasteyer finished their runs in the Chicago company on January 22, 2006. On May 30, 2006 Reinders replaced Megan Hilty as Glinda in the Broadway production. While playing this role she performed "Popular" in a Daily Double about Wicked on an all-celebrity episode of Jeopardy!. TV personality Nancy Grace gave the correct question. Reinders ended her run on January 7, 2007, along with former Chicago co-star Ana Gasteyer.

Reinders performed in the show Party Come Here, which ran as part of the Williamstown Theatre Festival from July 25 through August 5, 2007. She appeared in the play The Fabulous Life of a Size Zero at the Off-Broadway DR2 Theater in 2007.

Reinders was also a member of the band Tastiskank, along with Sarah Litzsinger. Reinders and Litzsinger co-starred opposite Constantine Maroulis in an independent TV pilot called Teachers. She also had a recurring role as Ginger on the third season of the television series Ugly Betty. Reinders starred as a regular character, "Paula Morgan", on the Lifetime series Sherri starring former The View co-host Sherri Shepherd. The show premiered on October 5, 2009.

Reinders returned to the Gershwin Theatre on October 27, 2008, and took part in The Yellow Brick Road Not Taken, a selection of scenes and songs cut from early drafts of the musical Wicked.

Reinders appears in the Mohegan Sun commercial "Everyone's Invited", singing to the tune of the Rick James song "Super Freak" alongside former Wicked co-star Saycon Sengbloh. She appears in the concert revue For The Record: Baz Luhrmann in Los Angeles, presented by ROCKLA for Show at Barre. It opened February 12, 2011, and closed June 30, 2011, with Jenna Leigh Green, Arielle Jacobs, and Tracie Thoms. Reinders voices the character Jezebel in the video game Saints Row: Gat out of Hell.

Reinders originated the role of Portia in the Broadway musical comedy Something Rotten!, which opened April 22, 2015, at the St. James Theatre. Her last performance was on July 16, 2016.

Reinders was seen recently on Broadway as the standby for Corky in Meteor Shower.

It was announced on October 8, 2018, that Reinders would assume the role of Cynthia Weil in the Broadway production of Beautiful: The Carole King Musical, replacing Kara Lindsay on October 19. As of 2019, she has been portraying Miss Jenn in the Disney+ series High School Musical: The Musical: The Series.

Personal life
Reinders was born on December 10, 1980, in Seattle, Washington. She married fellow actor Andrew Samonsky in May 2016.
Reinders gave birth to her son Luke in 2017.

Filmography

Film

Television

Video games

Theatre

Awards and nominations

References

External links
  
 
 Kate Reinders JoyHog! Inquisitor.

American musical theatre actresses
Living people
People from Muskegon, Michigan
1980 births
Actresses from Michigan
Singers from Michigan
Singers from Washington (state)
Actresses from Seattle
People from Spring Lake, Michigan
21st-century American women